Twenty Thousand Dollars for Seven (also known as 20.000 dollari sporchi di sangue) is a 1969 Italian Spaghetti Western film directed by Alberto Cardone and starring Brett Halsey.

Cast
Brett Halsey as Fred Leinster
Germano Longo as Il falso sceriffo (as Herman Lang)
Aurora Battista
Fernando Sancho as Bill Cochran, capo dei banditi
Eugenio Battisti as Jerry, il bimbo rapito
Teresa Gimpera as Jane, sua madre
Antonio Casas as Un bandito
Howard Ross as Vice-sceriffo
Marco Gobbi		
Andrea Fantasia		
Gino Marturano		
Claudio Trionfi		
Adalberto Rossetti		
Francisco Sanz	as Francisco Mateu Sanz

References

External links

1969 films
1960s Italian-language films
Spaghetti Western films
1969 Western (genre) films
Films shot in Almería
1960s Italian films